The 2016 Wrestling World Cup - Men's Greco-Roman  was the first of a set of three FILA Wrestling World Cups in 2016. Will be held in Shiraz, Iran at the Shahid Dastgheib Stadium On May 19 to May 20, 2016.

Pool stage

Pool A

{| class="wikitable outercollapse"
! POOL A
|-
| Round I

Pool B

Medal Matches

Final classement

See also
2016 Wrestling World Cup - Men's freestyle
2016 World wrestling clubs Cup - Men's freestyle

References

External links
 World Cup 2016

2016 Wrestling World Cup
International wrestling competitions hosted by Iran
2016 in Iranian sport